Rivne amber, occasionally called Ukrainian amber, is amber found in the Rivne Oblast and surrounding regions of Ukraine and Belarus. The amber is dated between Late Eocene and Early Miocene, and suggested to be contemporaneous to Baltic amber.  Major exploration and mining of the amber did not start until the 1990s.

Geology
The late Eocene amber is hosted in the Mezhigorje Formation, with early reports of occurrences in the underlying Obukhov Formation as well. The formations are found along the northwestern margin of the Ukrainian Crystalline Shield exposed in the Rivne region of the Ukraine and across the border near Rechitsa in the Gomel Region of Belarus. The granite basement rock was overlain by sandy to clayey deposits that were host to alluvial amber. Both formations are sandy to clayey in texture, with the Obukhov having more clayey glauconite-quartz plus sandy loess, while the Mezhigorje is mostly medium to fine grained sands of a greenish gray tone, and with occasional iron impregnation and layering.

Prehistoric use
Small amounts of rough, partially worked, and fully shaped amber have been recovered from Paleolithic and Neolithic sites in the Dnieper area.  At a site near Mezhyrich, four large mammoth bone huts attributed to Cro-Magnon Homo sapiens included over 300 pieces of amber attributed to Rivne origins.  Many of the amber pieces are roughly fashioned into triangular and circular shapes.  Dating of the site ranges between 13,300 and 10,500 B.C., when the regions of Baltic amber deposits in Kaliningrad and Lithuania were still covered with ice-sheets.  A small female statuette of carved amber was found near Dobranichevka, while a  disc with a central hole, and a hunting scene carved on one side was found in a Globular Amphora culture tomb in the Dubno district of Ukraine.

Mining
The main use of amber until the 20th century was for burning, and rarely was it shaped for crafts.  As such, before the 1990s amber recovery wasn't overseen by the Ukrainian government, with small amounts found after rains and thaws and during well construction and while the Kyiv-Kovel rail line was being built.  Small scale collecting of the amber started to gain momentum in the 1950s when granite deposits in the Klesiv area were beginning to be developed. At that time the amber was picked from drainage piles and tailings dumps of the granite quarries, often limited in access by the quarry operators.  Following an increase in the amber for jewelry production in Kyiv, Lithuania, and Poland, during the 1970s investigation and eventual start of the Pugach quarry in Klesiv culminated in 1991.  In 1993 the Ukrainian government first started state overseen mining, under the auspices of Ukrburshtyn and at the same time making other major amber mining illegal.  The current mining, centered on the Pugach quarry is operated by Burshtyn-Ukrainy. Since 2014 and the breakdown of law and order following the Euromaidan, 90% of Ukrainian amber is extracted illegally and the trade is controlled by armed organised crime groups. The amber is extracted by pumping water into the sandy sediments forcing the amber to the surface, creating pits. Areas where the amber is found are often covered in pine-beech forest, which is illegally deforested to extract the amber. Annual volumes of amber extracted illegally are suggested to be around 300 tons. The richest placer deposits of Rivne amber are associated with the Obukhiv (late Eocene) and Mezhigorje (early Oligocene) Formations; deposits in the Kyiv region are known to come from the base of the Mezhigorje Fm.  The majority of Rivne amber is mined from the lower part of the aforementioned Formation, with the most notable locality being the Pugach Quarry in Klesiv.

Composition
Amber from the Klesiv deposit and others in Ukraine have up to 0.1% Fe giving many pieces yellow-brown and brownish red tones to the amber, though nearly crystal clear to totally opaque are found as well. Rare pieces have light green to pale green coloration, which typically fades to yellow after a year or two in the small pieces. Amber from the Volnoje area northwest of Klesiv often show a smooth transparent dark yellow crust, which is rarely seen in Klesiv specimens. Similar to Baltic amber, Rivne amber is viscous in plasticity and unaltered pieces of both have a density of 0.98–1.13 g/cm3. Infrared spectroscopy of the amber shows carboxyl, hydroxyl, peroxide, and complex ester functional groups and additionally single and double bonds in the molecular structure are present placing Rivne amber in the succinite range, same as Baltic amber. Trace amounts of Pb, Y, Zn, Zr, and some other elements are present in Rivne amber. Small to no detectable amounts of those elements are detected in Baltic amber.

Paleoecology
There are a number of arthropod taxa, ranging from planthoppers, such as Alicodoxa, and ants to mites and spiders that are shared between Rivne and Baltic amber.  As of 2016 there were 193 ant species described from Priabonian age European ambers, with all but 56 of the species being found in or described originally from Baltic amber, while Rivne amber hosts 31 of the 56 species that are not known from Baltic amber.  Based on the differences in ant fauna between Baltic amber and Rivne amber, it has been suggested by Perkovsky that the two were different areas of a large forest that covered Late Eocene to early Oligocene Europe.  The spiders of Rivne amber are similar to Baltic amber ones, but there is a notable percentage that are unique species not shared between the two.  Similarly the gall midges from Rivne amber are entirely unique to Rivne and not shared at all with the Baltic amber.  A drier climate for the Rivne forest is also suggested based on the high percentage of the Collembola families Entomobryidae and Sminthuridae, 59.7% and 24.5% respectively of the Collembola fauna.  Baltic amber fly families have a distinct percentage of families associated with aquatic and semi-aquatic habitats, such as Chironomidae, while the Rivne fly fauna includes nearly double the amount of Sciaridae, Tipulidae, Mycetophilidae and other families associated with leaf litter habitats, called the "Sciara" zone.  This is also seen in the coleopterans.    There is an overall smaller number of aphids, a condition suggesting a possible subtropical climate for the Rivne forest, while the percentage of the hymenopteran family Scelionidae suggests a drier climate as well.

Taxa
There are several hundred families of arthropods identified from Rovno amber, with major reviews being compiled by Perkovsky et al (2003, 2007, 2010).

Plantae

Bryophyta
Brachytheciaceae
Ctenidiaceae
Neckeraceae
Rhachitheciaceae

Marchantiophyta
Jubulaceae

Crustacea

Isoptera
Porcellionidae
Trichoniscidae

Arachnida

Acari
Anystidae
Bdellidae
?Cepheidae
Cheyletoidea
Digamasellidae
Erythraeidae
Glaesacaridae
?Ixodidae
Liacaroidea
Microtrombidiidae
Oppoidea
?Rhagidiidae

Araneae
Araneidae
Clubionidae
Nesticidae
Oonopidae
Salticidae
Linyphiidae
Liocranidae
Zodariidae

Myriapoda

Chilopoda
Lithobiidae

Diplopoda
Polyxenidae

Entognatha

Collembola
Entomobryidae
Hypogastruridae
Sminthuridae
Bourletiellidae
Tomoceridae

Insects

Archaeognatha
Machilidae

Blattodea
Blaberidae?
Blattellidae
Polyphagidae

Coleoptera
Aderidae
Anthicidae
Artematopidae
Carabidae
Cleridae
Chrysomelidae
Curculionidae
Dermestidae
Elateridae
Helodidae
Languriidae
Lathridiidae
Leiodidae
Melandryidae
Melyridae
Monotomidae
Mordellidae
Mycetophagidae
Nitidulidae
Ptiliidae
Ptinidae
Scolytidae
Scraptiidae
Scirtidae
Scydmaenidae
Staphylinidae
Zopheridae

Diptera
Acroceridae
Asilidae
Bombyliidae?
Campichoetidae
Cecidomyiidae
Ceratopogonidae
Chaodoridae
Chironomidae
Clusiidae
Dixidae
Dolichopodidae
Drosophilidae
Empididae
Keroplatidae
Limoniidae
Mycetobiidae
Mycetophilidae
Mythicomyiidae
Phoridae
Psychodidae
Rhagionidae
Scatopsidae
Sciaridae
Simuliidae
Syrphidae
Tipulidae

Ephemeroptera
Heptageniidae

Hemiptera
Achilidae
Aleyrodidae
Anthocoridae
Aphalaridae?
Cercopidae
Cicadellidae
Cixiidae
Dictyopharidae
Drepanosiphidae
Electraphididae
Eriosomatidae
Lygaeidae
Matsucoccidae
Microphysidae
Mindaridae
Miridae
Ortheziidae
Pemphigidae
Piesmatidae
Pseudococcidae
Reduviidae
Saldidae
Schizopteridae
Tingidae
Tropiduchidae?

Hymenoptera
Aphelinidae
Bethylidae
Braconidae
Ceraphronidae
Chrysididae
Crabronidae
Cynipidae
Diapriidae
Embolemidae
Encyrtidae
Eurytomidae?
Eulophidae
Evaniidae
Figitidae
Formicidae
Ichneumonidae
Megalyridae
Megachilidae
Megaspilidae
Mutilidae
Mymaridae
Mymarommatidae
Paxylommatidae
Platygastridae
Pompilidae
Proctotrupidae
Pteromalidae
Scelionidae
Signiphoridae
Tetracampidae
Torymidae
Trichogrammatidae

Isoptera
Kalotermitidae
Rhinotermitidae
Stylotermitidae

Lepidoptera
Gelechioidea (family indeterminate)
Psychidae
Tineoidea (family indeterminate)

Mantodea
Family indeterminate

Mecoptera
Bittacidae

Neuroptera
Coniopterygidae
Hemerobiidae
Nevrorthidae

Orthoptera
Gryllidae
Tettigoniidae

Plecoptera
Capniidae
Leuctridae

Psocoptera
Archipsocidae
Caeciliusidae
Ephemeriidae
Epipsocidae
Psocidae
Sphaeropsocidae

Raphidioptera
Raphidiidae

Thysanoptera
Aeolothripidae
Merothripidae
Phloeothripidae
Thripidae

Trichoptera
Beraeida
Calamoceratidae
Ecnomidae
Hydroptilidae
Philopotamidae
Phryganeidae
Polycentropodidae
Psychomyiidae

Strepsiptera
Family indeterminate

References

External links 
 

 
Natural history of Ukraine
Miocene life
Eocene life
Mining in Ukraine
Paleontological sites of Europe
History of Rivne Oblast